Yes: Live – 1975 at Q.P.R. is a video release of a 1975 concert by the group Yes at Queens Park Rangers' Loftus Road stadium in England. Some of the footage was originally broadcast on The Old Grey Whistle Test. The performance was available for many years as a bootleg before former Yes manager Brian Lane co-ordinated a 1993 2-volume VHS release and a Japanese two Laserdisc release without any input from the band. In 2001, the video was released on a two disc DVD set.

Personnel
Jon Anderson – vocals, guitar, percussion, drums, whistle
Steve Howe – guitar, lap steel guitar, Portuguese guitar, classical guitar, tympani
Chris Squire – bass guitar, acoustic guitar, backing vocals, tympani
Patrick Moraz – keyboards
Alan White – drums, percussion

Track listing

Disc One
"Introduction - Igor Stravinsky: Firebird Suite" / "Sound Chaser"
"Close to the Edge"
I. "The Solid Time of Change"
II. "Total Mass Retain"
III. "I Get Up, I Get Down"
IV. "Seasons of Man"
"To Be Over"
"The Gates of Delirium"
"I've Seen All Good People: Your Move"
"Long Distance Runaround (Acoustic)"
"Clap"

Disc Two
And You and I"
I. "Cord of Life"
II. "Eclipse"
III. "The Preacher, The Teacher"
IV. "Apocalypse"
"Ritual (Nous Sommes du Soleil)"
"Roundabout"
"Sweet Dreams"
"Yours Is No Disgrace"

Yes (band) video albums
1993 video albums
Yes (band) live albums
Live video albums
1993 live albums